The Barbados Ice Cream Company Ltd. (BICO) is the leading Barbadian manufacturer of frozen desserts.  The company was started in December 1901, as the Barbados Ice Company Limited, which made ice.  It is now known as BICO.  BICO started making ice cream in 1949.  It is located near the Harbour Port Office park in Bridgetown.

History 
The Barbados Ice Company was formed as the result of a merger between two ice-making companies in 1901.  The new company was engaged exclusively in ice manufacture until 1910, when it decided to extend its facilities. The expansion was made for a cold storage department. In 1949, it expanded again and began manufacturing ice cream. Subsequently, in 1967, it became a subcontractor for the Barbados Port Authority. In 1976, the Barbados Ice Company changed its name to BICO. Since then BICO has discontinued its production of ice.

2007 to present 
Presently, it is a public limited company owned by over 350 shareholders, earning the majority of its revenue from its ice cream sales.

In June 2007, the company announced that it had completed renovations on freezer facilities, and the company expanded their previous  of storage space to just under  of storage space. The new freezer space gives the BICO company one of the largest, if not the largest, public cold storage facility in the Caribbean region.

In August 2009, the BICO manufacturing plant was destroyed by a fire causing the company to outsource operations to two Canadian-based frozen dairy manufacturers. Meanwhile, ongoing delays have caused the BICO leadership to continue pressing the company's insurers to disburse funds to undertake rebuilding the BICO factory.

Products 
BICO makes the following products:

Ice Cream
Valupak
Classic
Perfect Balance
Tropical Flavors
Double Delight
Old Fashioned
Sherbet
Frozen Yogurt
Soycream
Novelties
Brik Ice Cream Sandwich
Bicone
Yocone
Lollies

The company also exports to other Caribbean islands as well.  It is listed on the Barbados Stock Exchange.

See also
 List of ice companies

References

External links
BICO Ice Cream - Official website
BICO History

Food and drink companies of Barbados
Ice cream brands
Drink companies of Barbados
Companies based in Bridgetown
Ice companies
Barbadian brands